Pacemaker is an open-source high availability resource manager software used on computer clusters since 2004.  Until about 2007, it was part of the Linux-HA project, then was split out to be its own project.

It implements several APIs for controlling resources, but its preferred API for this purpose is the Open Cluster Framework resource
agent API.

Related software
Pacemaker is generally used with Corosync Cluster engine or Linux-HA Heartbeat.

See also
High-availability cluster
Red Hat cluster suite

References

External links
ClusterLabs, the home of Pacemaker.

Cluster computing
Free software programmed in C